Dieudonné Gbakle (born 20 December 1995) is an Ivorian born-Malian professional footballer who plays as a winger. He is currently a free agent.

References

External links
 
 

1995 births
Living people
Association football wingers
Malian footballers
Ligue 2 players
FC Metz players
21st-century Malian people